Line 13 of the Dalian Metro (R4) is a rapid transit line running mainly in northern Dalian. Phase 1 of Line 13 was opened on the 28 December 2021.

The line was once called Jinzhou–Pulandian intercity railway in the early plan bluebooks.

Opening timeline

Stations

References

13
Railway lines opened in 2021
2021 establishments in China